John Warrington can refer to:

John Warrington (cricketer) (born 1948), New Zealand cricketer
John Warrington (producer) (born 1962), British television producer
John Wesley Warrington (1844-1921), American judge

See also